Adherence, Adherer, and derivative terms may refer to:

Healthcare
 Adherence (medicine), the obedience of the patient to the medical advice
 Adhesion (medicine), abnormal bands of tissue that grow in the human body

Other uses
Adherent point, mathematical notion, also known as closure point, point of closure or contact point
 Adhesion, the tendency of dissimilar particles or surfaces to cling to one another
 Religious adherence, when people follow a particular religion